Laura Daniel-Davis is an American government official who is the nominee to serve as assistant secretary of the interior for land and minerals management in the Biden administration.

Education 
Daniel-Davis earned a Bachelor of Arts degree in political science and government from Wake Forest University in Winston-Salem, North Carolina.

Career 
Daniel-Davis worked as a senior policy and business development manager at Latham & Watkins. From 2007 to 2009, she was the Deputy Chief of Staff for then-Congressman Mark Udall from Colorado. She then joined the United States Department of the Interior during the Obama Administration, serving as associate deputy secretary and chief of staff. From 2018 to 2020, she was the vice president of the National Wildlife Federation for conservation strategy and later worked as Chief of Policy and Advocacy for the organization. At the start of the Biden Administration, Daniel-Davis was selected as principal deputy assistant secretary of the interior for land and minerals management.

Interior Department Nomination
On June 18, 2021, President Joe Biden nominated Daniel-Davis to be the Assistant Secretary of the Interior for land and minerals management. Hearings on her nomination were held before the Senate Energy Committee on September 21, 2021. The committee deadlocked on the nomination on November 18, 2021. Daniel-Davis' nomination was not acted upon for the rest of the year, and was returned to President Biden on January 3, 2022.

President Biden renominated her the following day. On February 8, 2022, the committee held a second round of hearings on the nomination. The committee again deadlocked on the nomination in a party-line vote on July 21, 2022. The entire Senate must move to discharge the nomination from the committee in order to progress.

On March 10, 2023, Senator Joe Manchin stated:  “Today, I have decided, as chairman of the Senate Energy and Natural Resources Committee, that I will not be moving forward the nomination of Laura Daniel-Davis as assistant secretary of the Department of Interior." This announcement by the Chair of the committee effectively ended Ms. Daniel-Davis' path to the position.

References 

Living people
Wake Forest University alumni
United States Department of the Interior officials
Obama administration personnel
Biden administration personnel
Year of birth missing (living people)
People associated with Latham & Watkins